Hardin College and Conservatory of Music (1858–1931) was a women's college located in Mexico, Missouri.

History 
On a day in the spring of 1873 Charles H. Hardin, Mexico attorney and future governor of Missouri, presented to the City Board of Education his check for $3,500, taking the first step in establishing “an institution of learning for the education of females” to be known as Hardin College. With this action he purchased a two-story frame structure that was built in 1857 as a private school and later used for public school classes, along with its surrounding five acres of land located near South Jefferson on the outskirts of town. For the next half-century Hardin College flourished as an outstanding school for young women.

Classes began in the fall of 1873. Two academic courses were offered: the Preparatory, consisting of basic primary studies, and the Collegiate, covering advanced classes. Seventeen girls enrolled in the former, seventy-three in the latter. They expected “wide-awake and energetic teaching,” a high standard of scholarship and, besides class recitations, daily drills in penmanship, vocal music, drawing, and the correct use of the English language. Over the years methods and courses changed, with increasing emphasis upon the collegiate course. By 1901 Hardin was recognized as the first junior college in the state, her graduates being granted advanced standing at many institutions. Attracting students from Illinois, Kansas, Texas, California and the Indian Territory as well as Missouri, it maintained an enrollment of around two hundred and a reputation as a “highly superior small College.”

Fees for the first year were set at $20 for the Collegiate Course, $15 for the Preparatory, and $80 for Room and Board. Additional costs included Music, $20; German, $10; Drawing, $10 and “Washing, per dozen, $.75.” A principal and six teachers were engaged who organized a regimen aimed at dispelling fears that “hard mental labor” for girls would famish the resources of the body.” Rising at 5:30, students retired at 9:30 after a day characterized by thorough studies, suitable food and regular habits. Seven minutes of each class hour were devoted to exercise – usually a brisk walk.

Clothing was to be free of laces and corsets; calico dresses, aprons and sunbonnets ere required. Leaving campus and “company – keeping” –talking with young men – were strictly forbidden. This routine was eased after a few years, with students welcoming a more reasonable and relaxed social environment.

From the beginning brick buildings were planned for the campus. By 1875 Hardin Hall provided a comfortable “College Home” rivaled by none. A Chapel was soon built, followed by a Gymnasium, Science Building, Swimming Pool, Richardson Hall, and in 1925 Presser Hall, bringing evaluation of its physical properties to over $600,000. By 1931, however, poor business practices, unwise investments, and financial entanglements coincided with a nationwide depression that drastically lowered its enrollment, forcing trustees to close the College.

Once called the “Queen of Western Female Schools,” Hardin was not without honor at home. Mexico's shops, schools, churches, homes and cultural pursuits had benefited greatly from its presence; residents deeply regretted its closing. They had long grown accustomed to the familiar wounds of piano students at practice, hockey games in progress, a bell ringing for dinner . . .  and on warm spring evenings, drifting across a shady lawn, the songs – and soft clear voices – of the girls of Hardin

Leta Hodge

Audrain Historical Society

Governed bay a Board of Trustees, Hardin benefited substantially from its founder, who initially donated nearly $40,000 and before his death had doubled that amount. It also benefited from the generosity of the people of Audrain County, who enthusiastically promoted the institution, subscribing $7,000 for its first new building and soon adding $8,000 to its endowment.

John W. Million was president in 1900 and the previous presidents were A. W. Terrill, Priscilla Baird (Mrs. H. T. Baird), and A. K. Yancy. Oscar B. Smith was president from 1930 until Hardin closed in 1931. Along with seven other women's colleges in Missouri – Stephens, Christian, Lindenwood, Cottey, Howard Payne, William Woods, and Central Female College – Hardin College and Conservatory of Music was one of the original members of Phi Theta Kappa, the international honor society for two-year colleges. Hardin was designated as the Alpha Chapter in 1918, though the chapter later moved to Stephens when it developed bachelor's degree programs. One of Hardin's buildings, Presser Hall, has been restored and is now known as Presser Arts Center. It sits on a 9-acre lot which also houses Richardson Hall and Hardin Gym.

See also 
List of current and historical women's universities and colleges

References

Further reading 
Clark, James G. History of William Jewell College. 1893.
Conard, ed. Encyclopedia of the History of Missouri, vol. I. 1901. p. 140 and vol. III, pp. 173–74
Williams, Walter. The State of Missouri. 1901. pp. 197–210

External links 

Missouri Colleges that have Closed, Merged, or Changed Names

Presser Performing Arts Center

1858 establishments in Missouri
1931 disestablishments in Missouri
Buildings and structures in Audrain County, Missouri
Defunct private universities and colleges in Missouri
Education in Audrain County, Missouri
Educational institutions established in 1858
Educational institutions disestablished in 1931
Mexico, Missouri
Music schools in Missouri